Donald Mervyn Ferguson (7 August 1936 – 9 March 2013) was an Australian politician who represented the South Australian House of Assembly seat of Henley Beach from 1982 to 1993 for the Labor Party. He was Deputy Speaker of the House of Assembly and Chairman of Committees from 1986 to 1990 and 1992 to 1993

References

 

1936 births
2013 deaths
Members of the South Australian House of Assembly
Australian Labor Party members of the Parliament of South Australia